Rhoptropus diporus is a species of lizard in the family Gekkonidae. The species is endemic to Namibia.

References

Rhoptropus
Geckos of Africa
Reptiles of Namibia
Endemic fauna of Namibia
Reptiles described in 1965